The Hopi-Tewa (also Tano, Southern Tewa, Hano, Thano, or Arizona Tewa) are a Tewa Pueblo group that resides on the eastern part of the Hopi Reservation on or near First Mesa in northeastern Arizona.

Synonymy

The name Tano is a Spanish borrowing of an older Hopi-Tewa autonym tʰáánu tééwa. Tano is often encountered in the anthropological literature referring to the ancestors of the Arizona Tewa before they relocated to Hopi territory. The name Hano, similarly, is a borrowing of tʰáánu into Hopi as hááno, háánòwɨ, which was then Anglicized. Hano in English also refers to Tewa Village, one of the main Arizona Tewa settlements. Other historical names include Tamos, Tamones, Atmues, Tanos, Thanos, Tagnos, Janos. Tewa is the preferred autonym (over Hano, Tano, and Hopi-Tewa) because the Tewa language refers to its people as "Tewas."

History
The Hopi-Tewa are related to the Tewa communities living in the Rio Grande Valley, such as Santa Clara Pueblo and Ohkay Owingeh.

The long contact with Hopi peoples has led to similarities in social structure with their kinship system and their organization to clans being almost identical with the Hopi (the other Tanoan Pueblo groups do not have clans). However, the Tewa dual moiety has been preserved.

Language

Many Hopi-Tewa are trilingual in Tewa, Hopi, and English. Some speakers also speak Spanish and/or Navajo. Hopi-Tewa is a variety of the Tewa language of Tanoan family and has been influenced by Hopi (which is an unrelated Uto-Aztecan language). Arizona Tewa and the forms of Rio Grande Tewa in New Mexico are mutually intelligible with difficulty.

What is remarkable about this speech community is that the influence of the Hopi language on Hopi-Tewa is extremely small in terms of vocabulary. Arizona Tewa speakers, although they are trilingual, maintain a strict separation of the languages (see also Code-switching: Example). These attitudes of linguistic purism may be compared with other Tewa speech communities in New Mexico where there has been very little borrowing from Spanish even though the Tewa and Spanish have had long periods of contact and the Tewa were also bilingual in Tewa and Spanish.

Traditionally, the Hopi-Tewa were translators for Hopi leaders and thus also had command of Spanish and Navajo. This contrasts with the Hopi who generally can not speak Tewa (although they may have limited proficiency in Navajo).

Notable people
 Nakotah LaRance, hoop dancer
 Nampeyo, potter
 Fannie Nampeyo, potter, daughter of Nampeyo
 Elva Nampeyo, potter, granddaughter of Nampeyo
 Priscilla Namingha Nampeyo, potter, great-granddaughter of Nampeyo
 Joy Navasie, second Frog Woman, potter
 Dextra Quotskuyva, potter, great-granddaughter of Nampeyo
 Neil David Sr, artist; katsina figure carver

See also
 Hopi
 Hopi Reservation
 Pueblo people
 Pueblo Revolt
 Tewa language

Bibliography
 
 Dozier, Edward P. (1954). The Hopi-Tewa of Arizona. Berkeley: University of California.
 
 
 
 Dozier, Edward P. (1966). Hano: A Tewa Indian Community in Arizona. Holt, Rinehart and Winston, Inc.
 Kroskrity, Paul V. (2000). Language ideologies in the expression and representation of Arizona Tewa identity. In P. V. Kroskrity (Ed.), Regimes of language: Ideologies, polities, and identities (pp. 329–359). Santa Fe: School of American Research Press.
 Stanislawski, Michael B. (1979). Hopi-Tewa. In A. Ortiz (Ed.), Southwest (pp. 587–602). W. C. Sturtevant (Ed.), Handbook of North American Indians (Vol. 9). Washington, D.C.: Smithsonian Institution.

External links
 Encyclopedia of North American Indians: Pueblo Languages
 Encyclopedia of North American Indians: Pueblo, Rio Grande

 
Native American tribes in Arizona
Native American history of Arizona
Tewa
Pueblo history
Colonial New Mexico
1680s in New Spain
17th century in New Mexico